Marcellus Rivers (born October 26, 1978) is a former American football tight end. He was originally signed by the New York Giants as an undrafted free agent in 2001. He played college football at Oklahoma State.

Marcellus Rivers played on the Houston Texans, New England Patriots, and the New York Giants.
After retiring, he took up coaching in Dallas,Texas.
He is currently an assistant football coach of the varsity football team at Prestonwood Christian Academy. He is also the coach of the 7th grade gold basketball ball team there and high school and middle school  track team.

References

1978 births
Living people
African-American players of American football
American football tight ends
Houston Texans players
New England Patriots players
New York Giants players
Oklahoma State Cowboys football players
Sportspeople from Oklahoma City
21st-century African-American sportspeople
20th-century African-American sportspeople